The 1968 Australian Rally Championship was a series of six rallying events held across Australia. It was the inaugural Australian Rally Championship.

Harry Firth and navigator Graham Hoinville won the Champion Driver and Champion Navigator titles respectively with a Ford Cortina Lotus.

Season review

The first Australian Rally Championship was decided over six events, staged across the Eastern States of Australia with two events in Victoria and one each in Queensland, New South Wales, Australian Capital Territory and South Australia.

The Rallies

The six events of the 1968 season were as follows.

Round Two – Snowy Mountains Rally

Round Five – Ampol Warana Car Rally

1968 Drivers and Navigators Championships
Final pointscore for 1968 is as follows.

Harry Firth – Champion Driver 1968

Graham Hoinville – Champion Navigator 1968

References

External links
  Results of Snowy Mountains Rally and ARC results.

Rally Championship
Rally competitions in Australia
1968 in rallying